William Douglas Jackson (5 December 1941 – 29 January 2018) was a Scottish rugby union player. He played on the wing for Hawick and won 8 international caps representing the Scotland national rugby union team.

Early life
He was born on 5 December 1941 in Hawick, Scotland. He was educated at Hawick High School.

Rugby career
Jackson made his debut for Hawick in 1958. He was a winger who stood 5 foot 10 inches tall and weighed 12 stones. In the 1969–70 season he scored 29 tries and equalled the club record.

His first international appearance was against Ireland at Lansdowne Road on 22 February 1964. His last test appearance for Scotland was against England at Twickenham on 15 March 1969.

He was later the manager of the South of Scotland under-21 team. At Hawick he was President and Sevens convener. He was director of Rugby at Hawick for a few years, until 2012.

He died on 29 January 2018 in Borders General Hospital, Melrose, aged 76.

References

External links
 

1941 births
2018 deaths
Hawick RFC players
People educated at Hawick High School
Rugby union players from Hawick
Rugby union wings
Scotland international rugby union players